Robert Frederick Bennett (May 23, 1927 – October 9, 2000) was an American lawyer and the 39th governor of Kansas from 1975 to 1979.

Biography
Bennett was born May 23, 1927, in Kansas City, Missouri. He married Joan Gregory, whom he met at Shawnee Mission Rural High School while participating in debate. They had four children: Robert F. (junior), Virginia L., Kathleen, and Patricia. He earned a B.A. in 1950 and a law degree in 1952 from the University of Kansas. He married a second time in 1971 to Olivia Fisher.

Career
Bennett served in the U.S. Marine Corps in China during World War II and he also served in the U. S. Marines again during the Korean War, was wounded and received a Purple Heart.

In 1952, Bennett began his own law firm with Robert Lytle. The firm continued for more than 40 years until it merged with Lathrop & Gage in the mid-1990s. He was a council member from 1955 to 1957 in Prairie Village. From 1957 to 1965, Bennett served as mayor of Prairie Village, Kansas (a suburb of Kansas City).

A member of the Kansas State Senate from 1965 to 1975, Bennett was known for his classic cowboy boots, cowboy hat, and beard. He was an eloquent speaker and would often send reporters scrambling for dictionaries. He was president of the state senate when he was elected to the governorship in 1974. This was the first election that candidates for governor and lieutenant governor ran as a team as well as for a four-year term rather than a two-year term. During his tenure, he reformed operations in the governor's office to make heads of state agencies more responsible to the governor.  In 1978, he lost his re-election bid to John W. Carlin and returned to his own practice and home.

From 1982 to 1983, Bennett served as chair of the Kansas Republican Party.

Death
Bennett died October 9, 2000, of lung cancer at the St. Joseph's Medical Center in Kansas City and was buried in Corinth Cemetery in Prairie Village, Kansas. An avid hunter and fisherman, he was also a member of the American Bar Association, the American Judicature Society, the Freemasons, and the Optimist Club.

References

External links

http://www.kansas.gov/
National Governors Association
Kansapedia
Publications concerning Kansas Governor Bennett's administration available via the KGI Online Library

|-

|-

1927 births
2000 deaths
20th-century American politicians
United States Marine Corps personnel of the Korean War
United States Marine Corps personnel of World War II
American Presbyterians
Deaths from lung cancer in Missouri
Republican Party governors of Kansas
Kansas city council members
Kansas lawyers
Republican Party Kansas state senators
Lawyers from Kansas City, Missouri
Mayors of Prairie Village, Kansas
Military personnel from Kansas
Politicians from Kansas City, Missouri
Presidents of the Kansas Senate
United States Marines
University of Kansas alumni
20th-century American lawyers